Amos Kent (January 3, 1902 – August 25, 1986) was a college football player and lumber salesman.

Early years
Amos Kent was born on January 3, 1902, in Kentwood, Louisiana, to Walter Campbell Kent and Katherine Esther Varnado. His great grandfather and namesake Amos Kent founded the town of Kentwood in 1850.  The older Amos came originally from Chester, New Hampshire.

Sewanee
Amos Kent was a prominent center and guard for the Sewanee Tigers of Sewanee:The University of the South.  At Sewanee Kent was a member of Sigma Alpha Epsilon.

1925
He was selected All-Southern.

Lumber
He was once the president of the Amos Kent Lumber Company.

References

External links

1902 births
1986 deaths
American football centers
Sewanee Tigers football players
All-Southern college football players
Players of American football from Louisiana
People from Kentwood, Louisiana
American football guards